The Armenian dance (Armenian: Հայկական պար) heritage has been considered the oldest and most varied in its respective region. From the fifth to the third millennia B.C., in the higher regions of Armenia, the land of Ararat, there are rock paintings of scenes of country dancing. These dances were probably accompanied by certain kinds of songs or musical instruments. In the fifth century, Moses of Khoren (Movsés Khorenats'i) himself had heard of how the old descendants of Aram (that is Armenians) make mention of these things (epic tales) in the ballads for the lyre and their songs and dances.

Traditional dancing is still popular among expatriate Armenians, and has also been very successfully exported to international folk dance groups and circle dance groups all over the world. All dancers wear the traditional costume to embody the history of their culture and to tell their ancestors stories. The design of these costumes are influenced by many factors, such as religious traditions, family methods, and practicality. The traditional coloring and exquisite beading of the costumes tie the dance and the tradition together. The beautiful movements of the Armenian cultural dance are adored by audiences around the world.

Religious dancing
The origin of religious dancing is ancient, an expression of the inner feelings of those who participated in such performances. It is of interest to note that dance never occurred alone, but was always accompanied with song, clapping of hands, and musical instruments. As with music, so too the dance expressed a person's internal spiritual emotions and personal disposition.

Soviet Union
During the 1920s and 30s, three Armenian dance teachers moved to Iran from the Soviet Union and opened dance schools. Their names were Madame Yelena, Madame Coronelli, and Sarkis Djanbazian. They taught ballet and character dance. Most of their students were members of the Armenian community in Tehran, but their classes were also attended by students from diverse backgrounds including Muslims, Jews, Baha'is and Zoroastrians.

Folk dances

  (Քոչարի) - Kochari is one of the most popular dances of Armenians. Kochari is danced in a group of men and women and is known for its tune played on the zurna.
  (Շալախօ) - A dance for men from Ancient Armenia. It is performed in dance studios by men, but danced at public gatherings by women as well.
  (Թամզարա)
  (Յարխուշտա) - Yarkhushta is a martial dance from the Taron and Aghdznik regions of Western Armenia.
  (Բերդապար) - Berd is a dance famous for having a circle of men stand on the shoulders of another circle and rotate. Berd means "fortress" in Armenian and is named accordingly because of the shape the dancers make.
  (Շիրխանի)
  (Հարսնապար) - from the Armenian hars which means bride, and par which translates to dance. The bride is shown dancing a solo and may possibly feature the bridesmaids.
  (Արծվապար) - a highland dance, associated with the eagle's flight, and an echo of ancient pagan rituals, one of the main elements of which was the image of an eagle (Arm. Արծիվ).
  (Գորանի)
  (Գյոնդ or Գյովնդ)
  (Մենապար) - Menapar translates to "solo." It may feature a man or woman. Normally, if a man is the one dancing, the music will be fast-paced and in the case of a woman, a slower, more elegant music will play.
  (Նազպար)
  (Շուրջպար)
  (Սուսերապար)
  (Փափուռի)
  (Զույգապար) - Zuykpar is a duet done by a man and woman. It features a liveliness to it and normally includes both dancers doing symmetrical movements.
 
  (Վերվերի)
  (Մշոյ խըռ) - originated in the region of Մուշ (Moush).
  (Լորկէ)
  (Ծաղկաձորի)
  (Կարնոյ քոչարի) - Very similar to Kochari, originated in region of Կարին (Karin).
  (Իշխանաց պար) - Also known as the "Lords' dance".
  (Ֆնջան)
  (Քերծի)
  (Քաջաց խաղ)
  (Թամուր աղա)
  (Թրթռուկ)
  (Սրաբար)
  (Աստուածածնայ պար)
  (Թարս պար)
  (Լուտկի)
  (Երեք ոտք)
  (Ճոճք)
  (Խնամիների պար)
  (Խոշ բիլազիգ)

Regional dances
  (Արաբկիրի Պար) - A dance from the Armenian city of Arabkir.
  (Քեսապական) - The Kesabian dance came from the city of Kesab, Syria.
  - originated among the fishermen of the Black Sea.
  (or Muş, or Mus, Մշո Պար) - a mixed dance from the district of Moush/Taron, west of Lake Van.
  (Սասնապար) - a popular dance common at weddings and other cultural gatherings. It originated in the city of Sasun.
  (Վաղարշապատյան)- originated in Vagharshapat now known as Ejmiatsin.
  (Զեյթունի պար) - originated in Zeytun.
 .
  (Զանգեզուրի) - a female solo dance.
  (Ղարաբաղի) - 1) a female solo dance; 2) mournful memorial dance from Nagorno-Karabakh.

See also

Notes

External links

 Clips of authentic Kavaragan Armenian Folk Dances from Historical Armenia: Tamzara, Popouri, Laz Bar, Arapkir Bar, Akheltskha Vart, Govduntsi, Bijou, Kessab Bar, Haleh, Shushan, Suleimanli, Shavali. (Archived 2009-10-25)

Dance
 
Folk dances